Year 1042 (MXLII) was a common year starting on Friday (link will display the full calendar) of the Julian calendar.

Events 
 By place 
 Byzantine Empire 
 April 19 – Emperor Michael V Kalaphates banishes his adoptive mother and co-ruler Zoë, for plotting to poison him, to the island of Principo. His announcement as sole emperor leads to a popular revolt.
 April 20 – Zoë is proclaimed as empress at an assembly in Hagia Sophia, along with her sister Theodora, as co-ruler. Michael V flees to the monastery of Stoudios, but is arrested, blinded and castrated.
 Zoë recalls Synodianos, governor of the Catepanate of Italy, and replaces him with George Maniakes (the disgraced head of the Sicilian campaign). All of Apulia is in the hands of the Lombard rebels.
 June 11 – Zoë marries her third husband, a Byzantine bureaucrat who ascends as co-emperor Constantine IX at Constantinople. Theodora agrees to surrender her co-emperorship.
 Summer – George Maniakes goes on a march through Apulia, plundering the towns that have declared for the Lombard rebels. Constantine IX recalls Maniakes to Constantinople.
 George Maniakes revolts against Constantine IX and is declared emperor by his troops. He captures Pardos who has landed with an army at Otranto to take over his command.
 Byzantine–Arab War: The Byzantines reconquer the fortress city of Edessa (modern Turkey), returning it to Christian hands, after 400 years of Islamic rule (approximate date). 
 Duklja secures its independence from the Byzantine Empire.

 Europe 
 January 25 – Abbad I dies after a 19-year reign as independent ruler of the Taifa of Seville in Al-Andalus (modern Spain). He is succeeded by his son Abbad II (until 1069).
 Casimir I, duke of Poland, succeeds in reuniting the realm which earns him the name "the Restorer". He signs a treaty with Bretislav I, duke of Bohemia, at Regensburg.
 June 8 – Magnus the Good becomes king of Denmark after the death of Harthacnut. Despite a claim to the throne by Sweyn II, Magnus takes control of Denmark.
 Autumn – Norman mercenaries assemble at Matera and decide to elect William Iron Arm as count of Melfi and leader of the Normans in Southern Italy. 
 Harald Hardrada, leader of the Varangian Guard in the Byzantine Empire, returns to Norway, possibly because of his involvement in Maniakes' revolt.
 Finnish–Novgorodian War: Grand Prince Vladimir Yaroslavich wages a campaign against the Tavastians (yem).

 England 
 June 8 – King Harthacnut collapses while attending a party. He dies without an heir, Edward the Confessor becomes king of England.

 Islamic world 
 The Almoravids, led by Abdallah ibn Yasin, invade Morocco (approximate date).

Births 
 Bolesław II the Generous, king of Poland (approximate date)
 Canute IV ("the Holy"), king of Denmark (approximate date)
 Fujiwara no Morozane, Japanese nobleman and regent (d. 1101)
 Gissur Ísleifsson, Icelandic clergyman and bishop (d. 1118)
 Johannes of Jerusalem, French monk and abbot (d. 1119)
 Louis the Springer, German nobleman (d. 1123)
 Minamoto no Yoshitsuna, Japanese samurai (d. 1134)
 Sancho V, king of Aragon and Pamplona (d. 1094)

Deaths 
 January 25 – Abbad I, founder of the Abbadid Dynasty (b. 984)
 June 8 – Harthacnut, king of Denmark and England
 August 24 – Michael V Kalaphates, Byzantine emperor
 Anushtakin al-Dizbari, Fatimid governor of Aleppo
 Pardos, Byzantine governor (catepan) of Italy

References